The 2021–22 season is Győri Audi ETO KC's 43rd competitive and consecutive season in the Nemzeti Bajnokság I and 75th year in existence as a handball club.

Players

Squad information

Goalkeepers
 12  Amandine Leynaud
 16  Silje Solberg
 89  Sandra Toft
Left wingers
 6  Nadine Schatzl 
 23  Csenge Fodor 
Right wingers
 22  Viktória Győri-Lukács
 48  Dorottya Faluvégi
Pivots
 5  Linn Blohm 
 7  Kari Brattset Dale 
 31  Yvette Broch

Left backs
2  Line Haugsted
4  Eszter Ogonovszky
8  Anne Mette Hansen (c)
 21  Veronica Kristiansen 
Centre backs
 15  Stine Bredal Oftedal 
 27  Estelle Nze Minko
 81  Júlia Farkas
Right backs
 9  Ana Gros
 11  Ryu Eun-hee
 80  Jelena Despotović

Transfers

 IN
  Sandra Toft (GK) (from  Brest Bretagne Handball)
  Line Haugsted (LB) (from  Viborg HK)
  Ana Gros (RB) (from  RK Krim) 
  Yvette Broch (P) (from  CSM București)
  Raphaëlle Tervel (assistant coach)

 OUT
  Amandine Leynaud (GK) (retires) 
  Laura Glauser (GK) (to  CSM București)
  Noémi Háfra (LB) (on loan to  Odense Håndbold)
  Laura Kürthi (RB) (to  Váci NKSE)
  Fanni Gerencsér (LW/LB) (to  Érd HC)
  Tamara Pál (CB) (to  MTK Budapest) 
  Johanna Farkas (CB) (to  Dunaújvárosi Kohász KA)
  Crina Pintea (P) (to  CSM București)

Club

Technical Staff

Source: Coaches, Management

Uniform
Supplier:  Adidas/ Mizuno
Main sponsor: Audi / tippmix / OTP Bank / City of Győr 
Back sponsor: PannErgy / Győrszol
Shorts sponsor: OMV / Leier / OIL!

Pre-season

Friendly matches

Competitions

Overview

Nemzeti Bajnokság I

League table

Results by round

Matches

Results overview

Hungarian Cup

Round 5

EHF Champions League

Group stage

Matches

Results overview

Knockout stage

Quarter-finals

Statistics

Top scorers
Includes all competitive matches. The list is sorted by shirt number when total goals are equal. Last updated on 18 March 2023.

Attendances

List of the home matches:

Notes

References

External links
 
 Győri Audi ETO KC 

 
Győri ETO